Scantic was a   coaster that was built in 1936 by Noord Nederland Scheepsmakkerij, Groningen as Dr Colijn for a Dutch owner. In 1940, she was transferred to the Ministry of War Transport (MoWT) and renamed  Empire Crocus. In 1947, she was sold into merchant service and renamed Stainton. A further sale in 1951 saw her renamed Benwood. In 1955 she was sold to Finland and renamed Monica. A further sale to Sweden in 1957 saw her renamed Mona. In 1963, she was sold to Denmark and renamed Scantic, serving until 7 December 1964 when she foundered in St Georges Channel, United Kingdom.

Description
The ship was built in 1936 by Noord Nederland Scheepsmakkerij, Groningen, Netherlands, As yard number 152.

The ship was propelled by a 222 nhp 4-stroke Single Cycle Single Action diesel engine, which had six cylinders of  diameter by  stroke. The engine drove a single screw propeller. It was built by MWM, Mannheim, Germany.

History
Dr Colijn was built for M Oosterhuis, Delfzijl, Netherlands. The Code Letters PDSD were allocated. In 1940, she was transferred to the MoWT and renamed Empire Crocus. She was placed under the management of T H Donking & Sons Ltd. The Official Number 167408 was allocated. Her port of registry was London and the Code Letters MNDN were allocated.

Empire Crocus was a member of Convoy OA 208, which departed from Methil, Fife on 2 September 1940 and dispersed at sea on 6 September. In 1941, part of her cargo was advertised to be auctioned as prize. Empire Crocus was a member of Convoy EBC 13, which departed Barry, Glamorgan on 16 June 1944 and arrived at the Seine Bay on 18 June. She left the convoy at Falmouth, Cornwall. On 7 July, she repeated the voyage as a member of Convoy EBC 34. Empire Crocus was a member of Convoy TS 63, which departed Takoradi, Gold Coast on 31 August 1944 and arrived at Freetown, Sierra Leone on 5 September.

In 1947, Empire Crocus was sold to H P Marshall & Co Ltd, Middlesbrough, Yorkshire and renamed Stainton. In 1951, she was sold to Mountwood Shipping Co Ltd, Liverpool and renamed Benwood. On 8 January 1952, Benwood was in distress off Great Orme Head, Caernarvonshire. The Holyhead lifeboat was launched but her assistance was not required. Benwood was escorted into Liverpool, Lancashire by a pilot boat. In 1955, she was sold to Rederei AB Henrik Selen, Borgå, Finland and renamed Monica. The Official Number 482 and Code Letters OFVF were allocated. In 1957, she was sold to N O Olausson, Sweden and renamed Mona.

In 1963, Mona was sold to J L Hansen, Rønne, Denmark and was renamed Scantic. On 7 December 1964, Scantic sprang a leak in St George's Channel, United Kingdom in heavy weather. She was on a voyage from Preston, Lancashire, United Kingdom to Poole, Dorset with a cargo of lime. Water entered the engine department, and a mayday was sent at 16:30. The five crew took to the lifeboat at 17:30, but it capsized.

References

External links
Photo of Benwood

1936 ships
Ships built in the Netherlands
Merchant ships of the Netherlands
World War II merchant ships of the Netherlands
Ministry of War Transport ships
Empire ships
Merchant ships of the United Kingdom
Merchant ships of Finland
Merchant ships of Sweden
Merchant ships of Denmark
Maritime incidents in 1964
Shipwrecks of Ireland